Grandview Heights Secondary School is a public secondary school in Surrey, British Columbia, Canada and is a part of School District 36 Surrey.

History
Grandview Heights was part of Surrey's plan to construct 10 new schools due to vast immigration, population growth, and the aging of existing school infrastructure. Construction of Grandview Heights Secondary School began in 2017 and was completed in September 2021. It was intended to be completed in September 2020, however, rising constructions costs delayed the school's construction by approximately one year.

References

External links
 Grandview Heights Secondary School website

High schools in Surrey, British Columbia
Educational institutions established in 2021
2021 establishments in British Columbia